Michael Costello (born January 20, 1983) is an American fashion designer and reality television personality. He appeared on the eighth season of Project Runway and the first season of Project Runway All Stars.

Early life
Michael Costello was born on January 20, 1983, in Sherman Oaks, Los Angeles. Costello's father is Italian-Hungarian and his mother is Greek Romani and Russian. At the age of 15, he moved to Palm Springs, California.

Career
Costello started designing clothes at the age of two by drawing dresses on his bedroom walls. At the age of 15, he opened his first store at 286 North Palm Canyon Drive in Palm Springs. It was at his first store in Palm Springs where Costello started making custom pieces for celebrities including Céline Dion, Jennifer Lopez, Toni Braxton, Barry Manilow, Suzanne Somers, Faye Dunaway, Florence Henderson, and more. Costello made headlines for designing a matching hat and dress for rapper Cardi B for Paris Fashion Week. Kylie Jenner wore one of his dresses for her birthday magazine cover and Costello has partied with Lady Gaga. He collaborated with Essie nail polish and designed his own lipstick and eyeshadow shades for Inglot Cosmetics.

Project Runway
In 2010, Costello appeared on the 8th season of Project Runway. Costello placed 4th place, and became best friends with fellow contestant Mondo Guerra. In 2012, Costello competed as part of Project Runway All Stars and finished as the 2nd runner up.

Grammys
On January 26, 2014, Costello garnered nationwide attention by dressing Beyoncé in a white lace dress for the 56th Annual Grammy Awards. Costello credits that moment as the turning-point of his career. Since then, Costello has continuously dressed her for On the Run Tour, The Mrs. Carter Show World Tour, the Grammy-sponsored Stevie Wonder tribute, the Wearable Art Gala at the California African American Museum, and more.

On February 15, 2016, Costello dressed Meghan Trainor at the Grammys. Costello's designs for Beyoncé, Meghan Trainor, Tamar Braxton, Toni Braxton, Alicia Keys, Maren Morris, and more are on display at the Grammy Museum at L.A. Live.

Costello offered to dress Bebe Rexha for the Grammy's after designers called her "too big".

Television
In 2016, Costello collaborated with award-winning costume designer Lou Eyrich to design gowns for Lady Gaga for the TV series American Horror Story, leading up to the team's Primetime Emmy Award win for Outstanding Costumes For a Contemporary Series, Limited Series or Movie.

On July 12, 2016, Costello appeared on Good Morning America and won a nationwide fashion challenge. The following day, he worked with Kim Kardashian in creating a red carpet dress for the ESPY Awards. The styling session was filmed for E! Entertainment Television's Keeping Up With the Kardashians.

Costello has appeared as a fashion guest for television shows like Wendy, Steve Harvey Show, Good Day LA, Good Day NY, and more.

Achievements

On March 18, 2017, Costello received a star on the Palm Springs Walk of Stars. The presentation was held by Palm Springs Mayor Robert Moon, who also gave Costello the key to the City of Palm Springs and declared March 18 as the "Michael Costello Day".

Personal life
Costello has two children Giovanni and Coco from an arranged marriage that ended in 2006. He is openly gay.

See also
 List of fashion designers
 List of Project Runway contestants

References

External links
 
 
 

American fashion designers
California people in design
California people in fashion
1983 births
Living people
American gay artists
LGBT fashion designers
LGBT people from California
LGBT Romani people
Artists from Palm Springs, California
Project Runway (American series) participants
American people of Hungarian descent
American people of Italian descent
American people of Russian descent
American people of Greek-Romani descent
American Romani people